Haegue Yang (Hanja: 梁慧圭; born December 12, 1971) is a South Korean artist primarily working in sculpture and installation. After receiving her B.F.A from Seoul National University in 1994, Yang received an M.A. from Städelschule where she now teaches as a professor of Fine Arts. She currently lives and works in Berlin and Seoul.

Yang's work often places disparate household objects into alternative configurations, exploring meanings they can take on outside of their typical functional uses. Her installations sometimes engage multiple senses by incorporating lights, smells, sounds, and tactile materials that reorient and recalibrate viewers' perception. Common themes that appear in Yang's work are displacement, itinerancy, familiarity, and estrangement. Yang is a particularly prolific contemporary artist–her 2018 catalogue raisonné, published in conjunction with her solo show "ETA" at Museum Ludwig, lists over 1,400 works.

Early life and education
Yang was born in South Korea in 1971. Her father, Hansoo Yang (born 1945, Seoul), is a journalist and her mother, Misoon Kim (born 1945, Incheon), is a writer. Hansoo Yang worked for an international construction company after he was dismissed from his job at the Dong-A Ilbo along with 160 colleagues for protesting censorship under Park Chung-hee's regime. Both Hansoo Yang and Misoon Kim were active in the Minjung Movement.

Haegue Yang received her Bachelor of Fine Arts (B.F.A.) in 1994 from Seoul National University in Korea with a focus on sculpture. In 1995, she moved to Germany to study with artist Georg Herold at Städelschule. She was an exchange student at Cooper Union in New York City from 1996 to 1997. She graduated in 1999 with her Master's (Meisterschüler).

Work
After receiving her B.F.A., Yang moved to Germany and began her artistic career in the late 1990s. Yang participated in her first show outside of Städelschule at Frankfurt's rraum, an alternative exhibition space in the apartment of Meike Behm and Peter Lütje. Her first solo show was held in 2000 at Berlin publisher and dealer Barbara Wien's gallery, after Wien met Yang at the Frankfurt Book Fair in 1999 and subsequently visited her studio. Initial difficulties selling Yang's work led to the gallery being unable to store the exhibited pieces, an episode which led to Yang's installation work Storage Piece (2004)–a pile of crates filled with Yang's work on top of shipping pallets.

Yang is currently based in Berlin and Seoul. Her main studio is located in Kreuzberg, Germany. She has been a professor of Fine Arts at the Städelschule since 2017. Her extensive oeuvre includes sculpture, installation, collage, photography, video, and performance. Curator and art critic Nicholas Bourriaud argues that in spite of the diversity of techniques and mediums, Yang's work is ultimately sculptural in its dealing with the fundamental question of the presence of the body in space.

Her sculptures often feature household objects and mundane materials. The objects range from drying racks, lightbulbs, yarn, electrical cables, and Venetian blinds. Yang attributes part of her interest in domestic objects to her upbringing in Korea during the 70s and 80s. Yang sometimes pairs these objects with additional sensorial components, such as steam from a humidifier, temperature changes using a heater and air conditioner, and diffused smells in iterations of her "Series of Vulnerable Arrangements" (2006-8).

Yang states that while her work could be seen as conceptual in its broadest definition, and thus drawing from conceptual art from the 1960s and 70s, she believes a redefinition of the term conceptual art is needed for determining its role in contemporary art now. Yang argues that for her practice, abstraction does not negate the possibility for narrative in her work, but instead "allows a narrative to be achieved without constituting its own limits." Art historian Joan Kee contends that Yang's interest in formalism "is marked by a sustained attention to morphology, to structure."

When responding to questions around the role of feminism in her work, Yang argues that while sculptures like Sallim (shown at the 53rd Venice Biennale in 2009) can engage with issues around gender in references to housework, they have multiple valences that can extend into religion, immigration, and class. She has also pushed against the critical emphasis on her diasporic status in interpretations of her practice. In thinking about the relationship between aesthetics and politics, Yang cites Felix Gonzalez-Torres, whose work was shown with Yang in the 2011 show "The Sea Wall": "I say the best thing about aesthetics is that the politics which permeate it are totally invisible."

In response to rising rent prices in Berlin, Yang and a number of friends – including artists Rirkrit Tiravanija, Nairy Baghramian, and Danh Võ – relocated their studio spaces in 2016 to a former pig farm in Stechlin, Brandenburg with a set of stone barns dating back to the 18th century.

Light and Visibility

Venetian Blinds 

Yang began using Venetian blinds in her work in 2006 for a show at BAK, Utrecht. She became interested in the way blinds can filter light and thus alter conditions of visibility for the viewer. Yang's use of blinds reconfigure exhibition spaces through the interplay of transparency and opacity, both disconnecting and connecting different parts of exhibition spaces. Her large-scale installation works such as Accommodating the Epic Dispersion--On Non-cathartic Volume of Dispersion (2012) refuse a single point of apprehension, transforming space in conjunction with light and color.

Lighting 
A number of Yang's sculptures incorporate household light fixtures and their wiring as pre-fabricated sculptural components. Yang's interest in light as a sculptural medium stems from its ability to claim physical space as a distinct, and sometimes even anthropomorphic, object.

Light plays an integral role in Sadong 30 (2006), a work made at Yang's grandmother's former home in Incheon which the artist describes as her only site-specific piece. Yang reconnected the house's electricity in order to power string lights, illuminating both paper origami as well as the dirt and debris which accumulated after the house's abandonment.

Historical and Biographical References 
Particular works of Yang's invoke meetings of historical figures, such as the Venetian blinds in Red Broken Mountainous Labyrinth (2008) which refer to Korean independence fighter Kim San (1905-1938) and American journalist Nym Wales (Helen Foster Snow, 1907–1997), and the blinds in Lethal Love (2008) that reference head of the German Green Party Petra Kelly (1947-1992) and former Brundesweher General Gert Bastian (1923-presumably 1992).

In addition to historical figures, Yang often references authors and filmmakers, including Korean-Japanese essayist Suh Kyungsik, author Primo Levi, novelist George Orwell, filmmaker Nagisa Oshima, and author Marguerite Duras (Yearning Melancholy Red, 2008; Malady of Death, 2010-ongoing). Yang's interest in work by or centered on diasporic figures stems from her research into people such as Suh, who had written a book on Levi, and consideration of the parallels between seemingly disparate figures spanning multiple geographies and times. Yang is less interested in establishing direct linkages between them and is instead concerned with the gaps between them that allow her to "transform it into an area of productive fiction." Her work exploring this "area of productive fiction" allows her to consider the connections between public and private life.

The Malady of Death (2010 - ongoing) 
Beginning in 2010 during her residency at the Walker Art Center in Minneapolis in the United States, Yang has staged a series of readings of the French writer Marguerite Duras' 1982 novella The Malady of Death. The language, performers, and visual components of each reading have varied.

In December 2015, as part of Mobile M+: Live Art, Yang presented The Malady of Death: Écrire et Lire, which consisted of a staging of The Malady of Death at Hong Kong's Sunbeam Theatre and the publication of the novella's first Chinese translation. Held over two nights, the opening performance saw Hong Kong writer Hon Lai-chu recite Duras' text. The staging included a burning mosquito coil, moving lights, and intermittent background projections of an image of the French actress Jeanne Balibar.

To date, The Malady of Death has been performed at the Walker Art Center, Minneapolis (2010); Namsan Arts Center, Seoul (2010); dOCUMENTA (13), Kassel, (2013); and Mobile M+: Live Art, Hong Kong (2015).

Movement and Migration 
Some of Yang's sculptures center around the theme of movement, either by using materials commonly understood to be mobile (e.g. moving theater lights in her venetian blind pieces) or by creating kinetic pieces which require performers to interact with the work, such as Rotating Notes--Dispersed Episodes I-V (2013). Works referencing diasporic figures and multiple geographies, such as Coordinates of Speculative Solidarity (2019), also consider the movement of individuals across national borders and reflect on the divisions that these boundaries create.

"The Art and Technique of Folding the Land" (2011) 
The title of Yang's solo exhibition at the Aspen Art Museum refers to ideas present in both Daoism and Western folklore of traveling large distances with each step.

Dress Vehicles (2012)

Yang's Dress Vehicles consist of aluminum frames surrounding permeable surfaces made of blinds, yarn, or macramé. The sculptures include handles which performers use to move the pieces around the exhibition space.

"Sonic Figures" (2013-ongoing) 
Inspired by Oskar Schlemmer’s Triadisches Ballet from 1922, "Sonic Figures" is a series of intricate sculptures made of numerous brass-plated bells affixed to wheeled steel stands. Performers rotate the pieces using handles in order to make the bells ring. M+ both commissioned and later acquired her piece Sonic Rescue Ropes.

Outdoor Commissions

An Opaque Wind (2015) 
This outdoor commission for the twelfth Sharjah Biennial took shape partially due to Yang's personal interest in the United Arab Emirates and the historical implications of Korean workers in the country. Yang's father worked in Libya, Liberia, and other countries in Africa and the Middle East as part of the Jungdong (Middle East) boom that brought more than one million South Korean workers to the Gulf region. For the outdoor portion of the work, Yang brought together vent sculptures on brick and concrete block pedestals with a sandalwood vestibule, satellite dish, and walls made of steel tubes and corrugated metal sheets. The indoor part of the installation titled Fathers' Room featured a spare room with palm mats, a mattress topper, a lamp, and community newspapers.

Migratory DMZ Birds on Asymmetric Lens (2020) 
Yang's commissioned work for the 2020-21 "Ground/work" exhibition at the Clark Art Institute imagines a meeting between birds of New England and Korea's Demilitarized Zone in order to draw parallels between the ecological diversity of the two regions. Unlike Yang's past sculptures, which typically are shown indoors and made of found materials, the three sculptures scattered around the Clark's grounds are composed of stone pedestals with 3D-printed biocompatible birdbaths for the animals in the area. The birdbaths are also a reference to the sound of birds audible on the broadcast of the April 2018 inter-Korean summit.

Selected Exhibitions 

Yang participated in the 2006 São Paulo Art Biennial, 55th Carnegie International in Pittsburgh, 2008 Turin Triennale, dOCUMENTA (13) in Kassel, Biennale de Lyon, Sharjah Biennial, and 8th Asia Pacific Triennial of Contemporary Art. She represented South Korea in the 53rd Venice Biennale in 2009. Yang's first exhibition in the United States, titled "Brave New Worlds", was held in 2007 at the Walker Art Center in Minneapolis, Minnesota. The artist also had solo exhibitions in Asian institutions including the UCCA Center for Contemporary Art, Beijing, and Leuum, Samsung Museum of Art, Seoul.

"Condensation" (2009) 
For her solo exhibition in the Korean pavilion for the 53rd Venice Biennale, Yang presented three works including Sallim (2009), an installation modeled on the kitchen in her Berlin home and studio.

Arrivals (2011)
For this solo exhibition running from January 2, 2011 to March 4, 2011, Yang presented works on three floors of the Kunsthaus Bregenz. The first floor featured pieces including Fishing (1995), Unfolding Places (2004), Restrained Courage (2004), and Squandering Negative Spaces (2006), Gymnastics of the Foldables (2006), and Three Kinds in Transition (2008). On the second floor, her Venetian blind installation Cittadella (2011) occupied the entire space. On the third floor, Yang installed a work titled Warrior Believer Lover (2011), which consisted of thirty-three light sculptures built on wheeled stands. Three times a day, Igor Stravinsky's Le Sacre du Printemps was played in the exhibition space.

Yang states that the title's multiple connotations include the end of a long journey, the divine, and a self-reflexive reference to her arrival as a globally-recognized artist.

Approaching: Choreography Engineered in Never-Past Tense (2012) 
As a part of dOCUMENTA (13), Yang's installation–set in an empty freight depot of Kassel's former railway station–incorporated black aluminum blinds that automatically moved up and down, and opened and closed.

Awards 

 Bâloise Art Prize, Hamburger Kunsthalle, Germany (2007)
 Cremer Prize, Stiftung Sammlung Cremer, Germany (2008)
 Public Art Competition for Malmö Live, Sweden (2015)
 Wolfgang Hahn Prize, Germany (2018)
 The Republic of Korea Cultural and Art Award (Presidential Citation) in the Visual Arts Sector, South Korea (2018)

Collections

 AmorePacific Museum of Art, Yongin, South Korea
 Art Gallery of Ontario, Toronto, Canada
 Bristol's Museums, Galleries & Archives, Bristol, UK
 Carnegie Museum of Art, Pittsburgh, USA; Explum, Murcia, Spain
 Galerie für Zeitgenössische Kunst, Leipzig, Germany
 Guggenheim Abu Dhabi, Abu Dhabi, UAE
 Kulturstiftung des Bundes, Halle an der Saale, Germany
 Hamburger Kunsthalle, Germany
 Kunstmuseum Stuttgart, Germany
 Leeum, Samsung Museum of Art, Seoul, South Korea
 Lidice Gallery, Lidice Collection of Visual Art, Lidice, Czech Republic
 Los Angeles County Museum of Art, Los Angeles, USA
 Museum Ludwig, Cologne, Germany
 Museum of Modern Art, New York, USA
 Muzeum Sztuki, Lodz, Poland
 M+, Hong Kong, China
 National Museum of Modern and Contemporary Art, South Korea
 Neuer Berliner Kunstverein e.V., Berlin, Germany
 Queensland Art Gallery, Brisbane, Australia
 Remai Modern, Saskatoon, Canada
 SeMA, Seoul Museum of Art, Seoul, South Korea
 Serralves Foundation, Contemporary Art Museum, Porto, Portugal
 Solomon R. Guggenheim Museum, New York, USA
 Tate Collection, London, UK
 The Museum of Fine Arts, Houston, USA
 Walker Art Center, Minneapolis, USA
 Westfälisches Landesmuseum, Münster, Germany

Further reading 

 Yang, Haegue. Siblings and Twins, exh. cat. New York: Sternberg Press, 2010.
 Giertler, Camille and Braat, Lize, eds. Haegue Yang: Family of Equivocations, exh. cat. Strasboug: L'Aubette & Musée d'Art Moderne Strasbourg, 2013.
 McDonald, Kyla and Sekkingstad, Steinar, eds. Dare to Count Phonemes. Berlin: Sternberg Press, 2013.
 Chong, Doryun, Yao, Pauline J., and Yang, Haegue, eds. The Malady of Death, exh. cat. Hong Kong: M+, 2015.
 Cotter, Suzanne and Yang, Haegue. eds. An Opaque Wind Park in Six Folds, exh. cat. Portugal: Serralves Foundation: 2016.
 Yang, Haegue and Bourriaud, Nicolas, eds. Haegue Yang: Chronotopic Traverses, exh. cat. Berlin: Bom Dia Boa Tarde Boa Noite, 2018.
 Yang, Haegue. Haegue Yang: VIP's Union--Phase I&II, exh. cat. Graz: Kunsthaus Graz, 2018.
 Barlow, Anne and Jackson, Giles, eds. Haegue Yang: Strange Attractors, exh. cat. London: Tate, 2020.
 Kim, Suki, Yang, Haegue, and Lee, Jihoi, eds. Haegue Yang: Air and Water-Writings on Haegue Yang 2001-2020. Seoul: MMCA and Hyunsil Publishing, 2020.

References

Living people
1971 births
People from Seoul
Bâloise Prize winners
South Korean women artists
Städelschule alumni
Textile artists
South Korean contemporary artists
21st-century South Korean artists
20th-century South Korean artists
20th-century women textile artists
20th-century textile artists
21st-century women textile artists
21st-century textile artists